Love Is the Way is the ninth studio album by Eddi Reader. It was released in the UK on 13 April 2009.

In a special arrangement with record label Rough Trade she sold an exclusive, pre-released and minimally-packaged version of the disc on her autumn 2008 UK tour.

Produced by Reader herself and recorded in a matter of days with her band in Glasgow, the record includes songs written with her longtime writing partner Boo Hewerdine, her life partner John Douglas (of The Trashcan Sinatras), songs from Irish songwriters Declan O'Rourke and Jack Maher, Edinburgh-based Sandy Wright, an Eddi/Fleetwood Mac mashup and a rare Brian Wilson composition.

The album was promoted by a 25-date UK tour starting in April 2009.

Track listing

Personnel
Eddi Reader – vocals
Boo Hewerdine – guitar, mellotron
Alan Kelly – accordion
Roy Dodds – drums
John Douglas – ukulele, acoustic guitar
Kevin McGuire – bass
Jack Maher – guitar
Teddy Borowiecki – piano, Moog, Hammond organ, bass accordion
Stephen Douglas – drums, backing vocals
Roddy Hart – piano
John McCusker – cittern, whistles
Heidi Talbot – harmony singing
Sam Bessa Reader – guitar
Charlie Bessa Reader – guitar
Meg Reader-Thompson – chatter

2009 albums
Rough Trade Records albums